South Africa competed at the 2018 Commonwealth Games in the Gold Coast, Australia from April 4 to April 15, 2018.

Track and field athlete Caster Semenya was the country's flag bearer during the opening ceremony.

Competitors
The following is the list of number of competitors participating at the Games per sport/discipline.

Medalists

|  style="text-align:left; vertical-align:top;"|

Athletics

Men
Track & road events

Field events

Women
Track & road events

Field events

Badminton

A team of 6 badminton players (3 men and 3 women) will be sent to the games.

Singles

Doubles

Mixed team

Roster

Michelle Butler-Emmett
Cameron Coetzer
Elsie de Villiers
Johanita Scholtz
Prakash Vijayanath
Bongani von Bodenstein

Pool C

Boxing

South Africa participated with a team of 2 athletes (2 men).

Men

Cycling

South Africa participated with 17 athletes (10 men and 7 women).

Road
Men

Track
Pursuit

Points race

Scratch race

Mountain bike

Diving

South Africa participated with a team of 3 athletes (3 women).

Women

Gymnastics

Artistic
South Africa participated with 2 athletes (2 women).

Women
Individual Qualification

Rhythmic
South Africa participated with 2 athletes (2 women).

Team Final & Individual Qualification

Individual Finals

Hockey

Both the men and women Hockey teams has qualified for the games. This comes as both teams are the African Champions. A total of 36 individuals are included.

Men's tournament

Roster

Daniel Bell
Dayaan Cassiem
Ryan Crowe
Tyson Dlungwana
Tim Drummond
Jethro Eustice
Gowan Jones
Ryan Julius
Gareth Heyns
Keenan Horne
Tevin Kok
Owen Mvimbi
Siyavuya Nolutshungu
Nqobile Ntuli
Clinton Panther
Reza Rosenberg
Daniel Sibbald
Austin Smith

Pool A

Ninth and tenth place

Women's tournament

Roster

Stephanie Baxter
Quanita Bobbs
Kara-Lee Botes
Dirkie Chamberlain
Sulette Damons
Illse Davids
Lisa-Marie Deetlefs
Celia Evans
Erin Hunter
Shelly Jones
Nicole La Fleur
Ongeziwe Mali
Candice Manuel
Jade Mayne
Phumelela Mbande
Kristen Paton
Nicolene Terblanche
Nicole Walraven

Pool A

Fifth and sixth place

Lawn bowls

South Africa will compete in Lawn bowls.

Men

Women

Para-sport

Netball

South Africa qualified a netball team by virtue of being ranked in the top 11 (excluding the host nation, Australia) of the INF World Rankings on July 1, 2017.

Roster

Pool A

Fifth place match

Rugby sevens

Men's tournament

South Africa qualified a men's team of 12 athletes by being among the top nine ranked nations from the Commonwealth in the 2016–17 World Rugby Sevens Series ranking.

Roster

Cecil Afrika
Timothy Agaba
Kyle Brown
Zain Davids
Branco du Preez
Justin Geduld
Werner Kok
Ruhan Nel
Dylan Sage
Philip Snyman
Siviwe Soyizwapi
Rosko Specman

Reserve: Mogamat Davids

Pool A

Semi-finals

Bronze medal match

Women's tournament

South Africa also qualified a women's team of 12. This qualification came after the South African women's team won the African Cup in 2017. The gold and silver medalist of Africa would then automatically qualify for the 2018 games. The silver medalists were Kenya.

Roster

Veroeshka Grain
Zenay Jordaan
Megan Comley
Unathi Mali
Nomsa Mokwai
Zintle Mpupha
Zinhle Ndawonde
Marithy Pienaar
Nadine Roos
Mathrin Simmers
Chane Stadler
Eloise Webb

Pool A

Classification semi-finals

Match for seventh place

Shooting

South Africa participated with 4 athletes (4 men).

Men

Open

Swimming

A total of 25 South African Swimmers has qualified for the games. This includes 2 para-swimmers.

Men

* Competed in heats only.

Women

Table tennis

South Africa participated with 1 athlete (1 man).

Para-sport

Triathlon

South Africa participated with 5 athletes (3 men and 2 women).

Individual

Mixed Relay

Weightlifting

South Africa participated with 3 athletes (3 women).

Powerlifting

South Africa participated with 1 athlete (1 man).

Wrestling

South Africa participated with 5 athletes (5 men).

See also
South Africa at the 2018 Summer Youth Olympics

References

Nations at the 2018 Commonwealth Games
South Africa at the Commonwealth Games
2018 in South African sport